The Majoidea are a superfamily of crabs which includes the various spider crabs.

Taxonomy

In "A classification of living and fossil genera of decapod crustaceans" De Grave and colleagues divided Majoidea into six families:
 Family Epialtidae
 Subfamily Epialtinae
 Subfamily Pisinae 
 Subfamily Pliosomatinae
 Subfamily Tychiinae
 Family Hymenosomatidae
 Family Inachidae
 Family Inachoididae
 Family Majidae
 Subfamily Eurynolambrinae
 Subfamily Majinae
 Subfamily Micromaiinae
 Subfamily Mithracinae
 Subfamily Planoterginae
 Family Oregoniidae

The classification has since been revised, with subfamilies Epialtinae and Mithracinae being elevated to families and Hymenosomatidae being moved to its own superfamily. The family composition according to the World Register of Marine Species is as follows:
 family Epialtidae MacLeay, 1838
 family Inachidae MacLeay, 1838
 family Inachoididae Dana, 1851
 family Macrocheiridae Dana, 1851
 family Majidae Samouelle, 1819 – "true" spider crabs
 family Mithracidae Balss, 1929
 family Oregoniidae Garth, 1958
 family Priscinachidae Breton, 2009

Notable species within the superfamily include:

 Japanese spider crab (Macrocheira kaempferi), the largest living species of crab, found on the bottom of the Pacific Ocean.
 Libinia emarginata, the portly spider crab, a species of crab found in estuarine habitats on the east coast of North America.
 Hyas, a genus of spider crabs, including the great spider crab (Hyas araneus), found in the Atlantic and the North Sea.
 Maja squinado, sometimes called the "European long leg crab or pie faced crab" because of the way its face is shaped.
 Australian majid spider crab, found off Tasmania, are known to pile up on each other, the faster-moving crabs clambering over the smaller, slower ones.
There is one fossil family, Priscinachidae, represented by a single species, Priscinachus elongatus, from the Cenomanian of France.

References

 
Cenomanian first appearances
Arthropod superfamilies
Extant Cenomanian first appearances